Vanadium fluoride may refer to:
Vanadium(II) fluoride (vanadium difluoride), VF2
Vanadium(III) fluoride (vanadium trifluoride), VF3
Vanadium(IV) fluoride (vanadium tetrafluoride), VF4
Vanadium(V) fluoride (vanadium pentafluoride), VF5